Stepan Wood is a Canadian lawyer (bar of New York) and legal scholar specializing in environmental law and transnational law who is a law professor at Osgoode Hall Law School. He was a Jean Monnet Fellow at the European University Institute in Florence in 2010/2011 and clerked at the Supreme Court of Canada after receiving his first law degree.

In 2017, Wood joined the Peter A. Allard School of Law at the University of British Columbia as a senior academic focusing on corporate social responsibility, sustainability, transnational governance and climate change.

He earned an LL.B at Osgoode Hall Law School and an S.J.D. at Harvard Law School.

References

Osgoode Hall Law School alumni
Academic staff of the Osgoode Hall Law School
Harvard Law School alumni

Living people
Year of birth missing (living people)